Nikil S. Jayant (1945 -- ) is an Indian-American communications engineer. He was a researcher at Bell Laboratories and subsequently a professor at Georgia Institute of Technology. He received his Ph.D. in Electrical Communication Engineering from the Indian Institute of Science, Bangalore, India in 1970.

Jayant's research has been in the field of digital coding, secure voice, and transmission of information signals. His research has been on techniques for speech encryption, packet voice, signal enhancement, robust vector quantization and image coding. He has made pioneering contributions to waveform quantization. He is the author of five books, and he has received 40 patents.

Adaptive differential pulse-code modulation (ADPCM) was developed for voice coding in the early 1970s by Jayant with P. Cummiskey and James L. Flanagan at Bell Labs.

He won the 1995 IEEE Donald G. Fink Prize Paper Award. In 1996, he was elected to the National Academy of Engineering for his contributions to the coding and compression of speech, audio and image signals.

References

External links
 Faculty Page
 Personal Homepage

Living people
1945 births
Indian emigrants to the United States
21st-century American engineers
Members of the United States National Academy of Engineering
Georgia Tech faculty
Indian Institute of Science alumni